The Victoria River (in French: rivière Victoria) is a tributary of the Chaudière River, therefore a sub-tributary of the St. Lawrence River.

The Victoria River flows through the municipalities of Val-Racine, Piopolis and Marston, in the Le Granit Regional County Municipality, in the administrative region of Estrie, in Quebec, in Canada.

Geography 
The main neighboring slopes of the Victoria River are:
 north side: Gunn Creek, Glen River;
 east side: lake Mégantic, Quinion stream, Bergeron River;
 south side: Fromagerie stream, Déloge stream, Chesham River, Bergeron River;
 west side: rivière au Saumon, Turcotte stream.

The Victoria River has its source in Noël Lake.

In its course to the north, then to the east, the Victoria River flows over  divided into the following segments:
  north-east, up to a stream (coming from the west);
  east, until you reach a road;
  northeasterly, up to the limit between the municipalities of Val-Racine and Piopolis;
  eastward, up to the boundary between the municipalities of Piopolis and Marston;
  eastward, collecting the discharge from lac McKenzie (Marston) (coming from the northwest), to route 263;
  eastward, up to its confluence.

The Victoria River flows onto the west shore of Victoria Bay of lake Mégantic in the municipality of Marston. This confluence is located southeast of the center of the village of Marsboro, southeast of downtown Lac-Mégantic and north of the village of Piopolis. A bridge has been built near the confluence of the Victoria River, at the foot of the "Côte du Bois", between the hamlets of Vieux - Piopolis and Marsboro.

Toponymy 
The toponym of this watercourse was attributed around the middle of the XIXth in honor of Queen Victoria, whose reign extended from 1837 to 1901.

The toponym "Rivière Victoria" was formalized on December 5, 1968, at the Commission de toponymie du Québec.

See also 
 List of rivers of Quebec

References 

Rivers of Estrie
Le Granit Regional County Municipality